John Herbert Siegle (July 8, 1874 – February 12, 1968) was a Major League Baseball outfielder.

Sources

1874 births
1968 deaths
Major League Baseball outfielders
Cincinnati Reds players
Dayton Veterans players
Grand Rapids Furniture Makers players
Springfield Wanderers players
Columbus Senators players
Schenectady Electricians players
Ilion Typewriters players
Utica Pentups players
Wilkes-Barre Barons (baseball) players
Indianapolis Indians players
Nashville Vols players
Binghamton Bingoes players
Huntington Blue Sox players
Columbia Lions baseball coaches
Baseball players from Ohio
People from Urbana, Ohio